Lallaguda railway station in Hyderabad, Telangana, India, located on the Manmad–Kachiguda section of South Central Railway. Localities like Lallaguda and Tukaramgate are accessible from this station.

Electric Loco Shed

Lallaguda Loco Shed holds 200+ 3 phaser locomotives like WAP-7 & WAG-9. 
It holds 110+ WAP-7 locomotives & 120+ WAG-9 locomotives.

Lines
Hyderabad Multi-Modal Transport System
Secunderabad–Bolarum route (BS Line)

External links
MMTS Timings as per South Central Railway

MMTS stations in Hyderabad